Word...Life is the debut album from underground hip hop artist O.C., who came to prominence in hip hop because of the album. It was released on October 18, 1994 by Wild Pitch Records. It also helped establish his membership in the legendary hip hop crew D.I.T.C., which includes Lord Finesse, Showbiz & A.G., Diamond D, Fat Joe, Big L and Buckwild, who produced the majority of this album.

The album is most remembered because of the single "Time's Up". The instrumental to the track was used in the movie 8 Mile, starring rapper Eminem, in a rap battle scene. The song was a scathing accusation, pointed at thug-posturers who were flooding the hip hop scene at the time.

Critical reception

AllMusic editor M.F. DiBella said that Word...Life signaled "the arrival of one of modern rap's more gifted storytelling lyricists", noting how O.C. delivers the "East Coast B-boyism" found in "Time's Up" but excels on "Born to Live" and the more "existential subject matter" on the record thanks to Organized Konfusion providing "thought-provoking intellectual diversity" throughout the record. In a retrospective review, Matt Jost of RapReviews praised O.C. for exercising his "creative control" on "straightforward, eloquent" tracks like "Ga Head" and "Let It Slide" and showcase "a more intricate, abstract side" on songs like "No Main Topic" and "O-Zone", concluding that: "While not always believable as a battle rapper, in terms of the rap game O.C. really had said all that needed to be said in "Time's Up." But it was on the album where he had to live up to his own words. Which he did, with some success. He helped introduce a new breed of MC's that left behind the playfulness of the Native Tongues, the anger management of Public Enemy, the controversial 'attitude' of N.W.A, the pop sensibility of Heavy D."

Track listing

2004 re-issue
Word...Life was re-issued in 2004, its tenth anniversary, with five bonus tracks. They are:
"Challenge Y'all"
"U Made Me"
"U-N-I"
"Half Good Half Sinner"
"Wordplay"

Album singles

Chart positions

Album

Singles

References

Sources 
discogs

1994 debut albums
O.C. (rapper) albums
Wild Pitch Records albums
Albums produced by Buckwild
Albums produced by Lord Finesse